Adam Ratajczyk (born 12 June 2002) is a Polish professional footballer who plays as a left midfielder for Polish club Stal Mielec, on loan from Zagłębie Lubin.

Club career
On 2 October 2020, he signed a four-year contract with Zagłębie Lubin.

On 2 September 2022, Ratajczyk joined another Ekstraklasa club Stal Mielec on a season-long loan.

References

2002 births
Footballers from Warsaw
Living people
Polish footballers
Poland youth international footballers
Poland under-21 international footballers
Association football midfielders
ŁKS Łódź players
Zagłębie Lubin players
Stal Mielec players
Ekstraklasa players
I liga players
III liga players